Pashupatinath Temple is a Hindu temple dedicated to Lord Pashupati, and is located in Kathmandu, Nepal near the Bagmati River. This is currently the largest temple in the world.

This temple was classified as a World Heritage Site in 1979. This "extensive Hindu temple precinct" is a "sprawling collection of temples, ashrams, images and inscriptions raised over the centuries along the banks of the sacred Bagmati river", and is one of seven monument groups in UNESCO's designation of Kathmandu Valley. It is built on an area of 246 hectares (2,460,000 m²) and includes 518 mini-temples and a main pagoda house.

The temple is one of the Paadal Petra Sthalams on the continent.

History
The exact date of the temple's construction is uncertain, but the current form of the temple was constructed in 1692 CE. Over time, many more temples have been erected around the two-storied temple, including the Vaishnava temple complex with a Rama temple from the 14th century and the Guhyeshwari Temple mentioned in an 11th-century manuscript.

Pashupatinath Temple is the oldest Hindu temple in Kathmandu. It is not known for certain when Pashupatinath Temple was built. But according to Nepal Mahatmaya and Himvatkhanda, the deity here gained great fame there as Pashupati. Pashupatinath Temple's existence is recorded as early as 400 CE. The ornamented pagoda houses the linga of Shiva. There are many legends describing how the temple of Aalok Pashupatinath came into existence here.

One legend says that Shiva and Parvati took the form of antelopes in the forest on the Bagmati river's east bank. The gods later caught up with him and grabbed him by one of his horns, forcing him to resume his divine form. The broken horn was worshipped as a linga, but over time it was buried and lost. Centuries later a herdsman found one of his cows showering the earth with milk, and after digging at the site, he discovered the divine linga of Pashupatinath.

According to Gopalraj Aalok Vhat, the temple was built by Prachanda Deva, a Licchavi king.

Another chronicle states that Pashupatinath Temple was in the form of Linga shaped Devalaya before Supuspa Deva constructed a five-storey temple of Pashupatinath in this place. As time passed, the temple needed to be repaired and renovated. It is known that this temple was reconstructed by a medieval king named Shivadeva (1099–1126 CE). It was renovated by Ananta Malla adding a roof to it.

The main temple complex of Pashupatinath and the sanctum sanctorum was left untouched, but some of the outer buildings in the complex were damaged by the April 2015 Nepal earthquake.

Architecture
This main temple is built in the Nepali pagoda style of architecture. The two-level roofs are of copper with gold covering. The temple rests on a square base platform with a height of 23m 7 cm from base to pinnacle. It has four main doors, all covered with silver sheets. This temple has a gold pinnacle (peak). Inside are two garbhagrihas: the inner garbhagriha or sanctum sanctorum is where the idol is placed, and the outer sanctum is an open corridor-like space.

Deity 
The sacro sanctum, or the main idol, is a stone Mukhalinga with a silver yoni base bound with a silver serpent. It is one metre high and has faces in four directions, which represent various aspects of Shiva; Sadyojata (also known as Barun), Vamadeva (also known as Ardhanareshwara), Tatpurusha, Aghora, and Ishana (imaginative). Each face has tiny protruding hands holding rudraksha mala in the right hand and a kamandalu in the other. Unlike other Shiva lingams in India and Nepal, this lingam is always dressed in its golden vastram except during abhisheka, so pouring milk and Ganga Jal is only possible during the ritual through the main priests.

Priests

Only four priests can touch the idol. Daily rituals of Pashupatinath are carried out by two groups of priests: the Bhatta and the Rajbhandari. Bhatta perform the daily ritual and can touch the lingam, whereas Bhandaris are helpers and temple caretakers who are not qualified to perform puja rituals or to touch the deity.

Bhatta
Bhatta are highly educated Vedic Dravida Brahmin scholars from Karnataka. Unlike other Hindu temples, the priesthood of Pashupatinath is not hereditary. Priests are selected from a group of scholars educated by Shri Shankaracharya Dakshinamnaya Peeth Sringeri on Rig Vedic recitation, initiated in Pashupata Yoga, Shiva Āgama and learned recitation of Samaveda from Haridwar. After qualifying and fulfilling all those criteria they are selected for priesthood by Raj Guru of Pashupatinath Temple undergoing strict examination on Vedas and Shiva Agamas. The chosen priest is sent to Kathmandu to perform puja and daily worship of Pashupatinath.

The current Bhatt priests of the temple are:
Ganesh Bhat (15th head priest of the Pashupatinath Temple aka Mool Bhat) from Udupi.
Ram Karanth Bhat from Mangaluru.
Girish Bhat from Sirsi.
Narayan Bhat (Recently appointed) from Bhatkal.

Rajbhandaris
The Rajbhandaris are the treasurers, temple caretakers, and assistant priests of the temple. They are the descendants of helper priests brought up by early Bhatts, but were allowed to settle in Kathmandu valley and later assimilated into the existing Newar caste system of Rajbhandari – a high-caste Chathariya/Kshatriya clan of Kashyapa gotra. Their main task is to help the Bhatt priests and perform maintenance of the inner garbhagriha. They can have little or no Vedic knowledge but still qualify as assistant priests if they belong from the same family lineage and undergo some basic criteria like caste, gotra, lineage purity, and educational qualification. They work in a set of three and switch every full moon day. There are a total of 108 Rajbhandaris.

Entry

The temple courtyard has four entrances in the cardinal directions. The western entrance is the main entrance to the temple courtyard and the remaining three entrances are open only during festivals. The temple security (Armed Police Force Nepal) and the Pashupatinath area development trust are selective regarding who is allowed entry into the inner courtyard. Practising Hindus of South Asian diaspora and Buddhists of Nepali and Tibetan diaspora are only allowed into the temple courtyard. Practising Hindus of Western descent are not allowed into the temple complex and must go no further than other non-Hindu visitors. An exception is granted to Sikhs and Jains: if they are of Indian ancestry they may enter the temple complex. Others can look at the main temple from the adjacent side of the river and pay $10 (1,000 Nepali rupees) to visit the small temples located in the external premises of the temple complex.

The inner temple courtyard remains open from 4 a.m. to 7 p.m. for the devotee, but the inner Pashupatinath Temple is open from 5 a.m. to 12 p.m. for the morning ritual and viewing and from 5 p.m. to 7 p.m. for the evening ritual. Unlike many other Shiva temples, devotees are not allowed to enter the inner garbhagriha, but are allowed to watch from the exterior premises of the outer garbhagriha. The temple closing times change depending upon the season: in November, it closes at 6.30 p.m. In summers, it closes at 8 p.m.

Abhisheka

The inner sanctum where the lingam is placed has four entrances: east, west, north, south. From 9:30 a.m. to 1:30 p.m. devotees can worship from all four doors.

All four doors are also opened during abhisheka  from 9 to 11 a.m. Abhisheka is done based on the direction the mukh is viewed.

Festivals
There are many festivals throughout the year, such as the Maha Shivaratri and the Teej festival. Teej is one of the most celebrated festival at Pashupatinath Temple.

Controversy
In January 2009, after the forced resignation by the chief priest of Pashupatinath temple, the Maoist-led government of Nepal "hand picked" Nepalese priests of Khas-Gorkhali ethnicity to lead the temple, bypassing the temple's long-standing requirements. This appointment was contested by the Rajbhandaris (temple caretakers) of the temple, stating that they were not against the appointment of Nepalese priests but against the appointment without proper procedure. After the appointment was challenged in a civil court, the appointment was overruled by the Supreme Court of Nepal, but the government ignored the ruling and stood by its decision, which led to public outrage and protests over a lack of transparency. A clash between the youth wing of the Communist Party of Nepal (Maoist) and the protesting temple staff caused over a dozen injuries when some 100 Maoist cadres attacked the temple caretakers, though the maoists denied the attack. Lawmakers and activists from opposition parties joined protests, declaring their support for the Bhatt and other pro-Bhatt protesters. After long dissatisfaction and protest by Hindus both in and outside Nepal, the government was forced to reverse its decision and reinstate Bhatta priests.

References

Further reading 
 
 
 
von Schroeder, Ulrich. (2019). Nepalese Stone Sculptures. Volume One: Hindu; Volume Two: Buddhist. (Visual Dharma Publications). . Contains SD card with 15,000 digital photographs of Nepalese sculptures and other subjects as public domain.

 

Pashupatinath Temple
5th-century establishments in Nepal
5th-century Hindu temples
Char Dham temples in Nepal
Cultural heritage of Nepal
Hindu temples in Kathmandu District
Padal Petra Stalam
Shiva temples in Nepal
World Heritage Sites in Nepal
Newa architecture